AA Drink–leontien.nl was a cycling team based in the Netherlands. The title sponsors were AA Drink ('after activity drink'), a Dutch sports drinks brand owned by United Soft Drinks, and leontien.nl, a women's health and fitness website associated with former champion cyclist Leontien van Moorsel, whose husband Michael Zijlaard was the team manager.

In August 2012, Zijlaard informed the riders and staff that the team would disband at the end of the 2012 racing season, as AA Drink were not extending their sponsorship beyond 2012 and he and van Moorsel had decided not to seek a new sponsor.

History

2008

2011

2012

Team rosters
2012

The 2012 women's road racing team included six riders who were formerly members of the disbanded Garmin–Cervélo women's team: British cyclists Emma Pooley, Lizzie Armitstead, Sharon Laws and Lucy Martin, Belgian Jessie Daams and Australian Carla Ryan.

Ages as of 1 January 2012.

2011

Major wins

2005
Stage 1 Geelong Tour, Nathalie Bates
Omloop Door Middag-Humsterland WE, Adrie Visser
Overall New Zealand, Suzanne de Goede
Overall Novilon Eurocup Ronde van Drenthe, Suzanne de Goede
Stages 1 & 2, Suzanne de Goede
Ronde van Gelderland, Suzanne de Goede
Rabobank Ster Zeeuwsche Eilanden, Suzanne de Goede
Overall International Thüringen Rundfahrt der Frauen, Theresa Senff
Stage 3, Angela Brodtka-Hennig
Stage 5, Theresa Senff
Sparkassen Giro Bochum, Angela Brodtka-Hennig
Stage 1b Giro della Toscana Int. Femminile – Memorial Michela Fanini, Suzanne de Goede
2006
Omloop het Nieuwsblad, Suzanne de Goede
Omloop Door Middag-Humsterland WE, Kirsten Wild
Overall Rabobank Ster Zeeuwsche Eilanden, Kirsten Wild
Stages 2 & 3, Kirsten Wild
Overall Tour de Feminin – Krasna Lipa, Theresa Senff
Stage 1,  Theresa Senff
Stage 1 International Thüringen Rundfahrt der Frauen, Angela Brodtka-Hennig
Profronde van Surhuisterveen WE, Adrie Visser
Holland Hills Classic, Theresa Senff
Stage 3 Euregio Ladies Tour, Sandra Missbach
2007
Overall Tour de Pologne Feminin, Kirsten Wild
Stages 2, 3 & 4, Kirsten Wild
Stage 3 BrainWash Ladies Tour, Kirsten Wild
2008
Omloop Het Nieuwsblad WE, Kirsten Wild
Omloop van Borsele WE, Kirsten Wild
Therme kasseienomloop, Kirsten Wild
Stage 1  Rabobank Ster Zeeuwsche Eilanden, Kirsten Wild
Stage 2 Tour Féminin en Limousin, Paulina Brzeźna
Profronde van Surhuisterveen WE, Kirsten Wild
Profronde van Oostvoorne, Chantal Blaak
Overall Trophée d'Or Féminin, Emma Johansson
Stage 5, Emma Johansson
Grand Prix de France, Ludivine Henrion
2009
Dolmans Heuvelland Classic, Lucinda Brand
Stage 5 Gracia–Orlová, Andrea Bosman
Therme kasseienomloop, Chantal Blaak
Stage 3 Rabobank Ster Zeeuwsche Eilanden, Andrea Bosman
2010
Gouden Pijl Emmen, Andrea Bosman
2011
 Track Cycling World Cup in Astana – team pursuit, Kirsten Wild (with Ellen van Dijk and Amy Pieters)
Omloop van Borsele, Kirsten Wild
Stage 1 Rabobank Ster Zeeuwsche Eilanden, Chantal Blaak
Erpe – Mere, Chantal Blaak
Stage 5 Giro della Toscana Int. Femminile – Memorial Michela Fanini, Trixi Worrack
2012
Stages 1 & 3, Kirsten Wild
Omloop van het Hageland – Tielt-Winge, Lizzie Armitstead
Gent – Wevelgem WE, Lizzie Armitstead
Stage 4a Energiewacht Tour, Kirsten Wild
Tour of Chongming Island World Cup, Shelley Olds-Evans
Durango-Durango Emakumeen Saria, Emma Pooley
Overall Rabobank Ster Zeeuwsche Eilanden, Kirsten Wild
Stage 3, Kirsten Wild
Stage 6 Giro d'Italia Femminile, Shelley Olds-Evans
Dutch National Record, Olympic Games: London, Team pursuit: 3:20.013, Kirsten Wild (with Ellen van Dijk and Vera Koedooder)
Stage 2 Tour de Feminin – Krasna Lipa, Kirsten Wild
Stage 3 Tour de Feminin – Krasna Lipa, Lucinda Brand
Stage 3 Tour Féminin en Limousin, Lucinda Brand
Stage 6 International Thüringen Rundfahrt der Frauen, Jessie Daams
Stage 2  Route de France Féminine, Lucinda Brand
Stages 1 & 2 Lotto–Decca Tour, Kirsten Wild
Overall Tour Cycliste Féminin International Ardèche, Emma Pooley
Stages 3 & 5, Emma Pooley
Stage 6, Carla Ryan
Stage 3 BrainWash Ladies Tour, Kirsten Wild

National and continental champions

2005
 Dutch National Cyclocross Championships, Daphny van den Brand
 Australian National Track Championships (Individual pursuit), Kate Bates
 Australian National Track Championships (Scratch race), Kate Bates
 Australian U23 National Track Championships (Scratch race), Kate Bates
 Australian National Track Championships (Points race), Kate Bates
 Dutch National Time Trial Championships, Suzanne de Goede
 Dutch National Track Championships (Scratch race), Adrie Visser
 Dutch National Track Championships (Individual pursuit), Adrie Visser
 Dutch Junior National Track Championships (Individual pursuit), Maxime Groenewegen
 Dutch National Track Championships (Points race), Adrie Visser
 Dutch Junior National Track Championships (Points race), Maxime Groenewegen
2006
 European U23 Track Championships (Points race), Marlijn Binnendijk
 Dutch National Track Championships (Scratch race), Adrie Visser
 Dutch National Track Championships (Points race), Adrie Visser
2007
 Dutch Road Race Championship, Marlijn Binnendijk
 European U23 Track Championships (Points race), Marlijn Binnendijk
 Belgian Time Trial Championship, An Van Rie
2008
 Swedish Time Trial Championship, Emma Johansson
 Polish Road Race Championship, Paulina Brzeźna
 Dutch National Track Championships (Scratch race), Kirsten Wild
2009
 Dutch National Team Time Trial Championships, Suzanne van Veen, Chantal Blaak & Marit Huisman
2010
 Dutch National Track Championships (500m Time Trial), Willy Kanis
 Dutch National Track Championships (Sprint), Willy Kanis
 Dutch National Track Championships (Keirin), Willy Kanis
2011
 Dutch National Track Championships (Points race), Kirsten Wild
 Dutch National Track Championships (Scratch), Kirsten Wild
 Dutch National Track Championships (Madison), Kirsten Wild (together with Ellen van Dijk)
2012
 Dutch National Track Championships (Omnium), Kirsten Wild
 British National Road Race Championships, Sharon Laws
 Dutch National Track Championships (Points race), Kirsten Wild

References
2012 UCI Women's Teams: AA DRINK – LEONTIEN.NL CYCLING TEAM (LNL) – NED UCI website.  Last updated : 13.01.2012

External links 

Official website (English version)

Cycling teams based in the Netherlands
UCI Women's Teams
Cycling teams established in 2005
AA Drink–leontien.nl
Defunct cycling teams based in the Netherlands